Hans Rosander (5 January 1937 – 12 September 2016) was a Swedish footballer who played as a defender for Västerås, Norrköping, Eskilstuna, and the national team.

References

1937 births
2016 deaths
Swedish footballers
Sweden international footballers
Västerås SK Fotboll players
IFK Norrköping players
IFK Eskilstuna players
Superettan players
Allsvenskan players
Association football defenders